This list is based on information from Financial and Capital Market commission.

Central bank
Bank of Latvia
Valsts Kase

Commercial banks

Foreign commercial bank Latvian branches 

Svenska Handelsbanken
Danske Bank
Bigbank
OP Corporate Bank
Scania Finans Aktiebolag
Luminor Bank Latvia Branch

Banks in Liquidation 

ABLV Bank
Sakaru banka
PNB Banka
Reverta
Trasta Komercbanka

References

Banks
List
Banks
Latvia
Ban
Latvia